NGC 43 is a lenticular galaxy in the Andromeda constellation. It has a diameter of approximately 27 kiloparsecs (88,000 light-years) and was discovered by John Herschel in 1827.

References

External links 
 

Lenticular galaxies
Andromeda (constellation)
0043
00875
00120
18271111
Discoveries by John Herschel